Rauli Antero Pudas (September 13, 1954 Alavieska) is a retired male pole vaulter from Finland. His personal best jump was 5.60 metres, achieved in July 1980 in Raahe. He became the Finnish champion in 1980.

Achievements

References

1954 births
Living people
People from Alavieska
Finnish male pole vaulters
Athletes (track and field) at the 1980 Summer Olympics
Olympic athletes of Finland
European Athletics Championships medalists
Sportspeople from North Ostrobothnia